Manila's 3rd congressional district is one of the six congressional districts of the Philippines in the city of Manila. It has been represented in the House of Representatives of the Philippines since 1949. The district consists of barangays 268 to 394 in the northern Manila districts of Binondo, Quiapo, San Nicolas and Santa Cruz. It is currently represented in the 19th Congress by Joel R. Chua of Aksyon Demokratiko and Asenso Manileño.

Representation history

Election results

2022

2019

2016

2013

2010

See also
Legislative districts of Manila

References

Congressional districts of the Philippines
Politics of Manila
1949 establishments in the Philippines
Congressional districts of Metro Manila
Constituencies established in 1949